John Gordon Mattatall (born December 1, 1982) is a Canadian former pair skater. With Mylène Brodeur, he is the 2009 Canadian national bronze medalist and placed tenth at the 2009 World Championships.
After retirement, John moved back to Nova Scotia and has recently been married.

Skating career 
As a single skater, Mattatall competed on the national level, competing many times at the Canadian Championships. Early in his pairs career, he competed with Lindsay Carruthers. They won the silver medal on the pre-novice level at the 2000 Canadian Championships. After that partnership ended, he competed with Renee Trembley on the novice level, placing 4th at the 2002 Canadian novice national championships.

From 2002 through 2005, Mattatall competed with Terra Findlay. They were the 2004 Canadian junior silver medalists and placed 10th at the 2004 Junior Worlds. They won a medal on the 2003–2004 ISU Junior Grand Prix. Findlay & Mattatall made their senior international at the 2004 Nebelhorn Trophy, where they placed 4th. They were coached by Doug Leigh and Lee Barkell at the Mariposa School of Skating.

In March 2006, Mattatall teamed up with Mylène Brodeur. They made their international debut at the 2006 Nebelhorn Trophy, placing 4th. They were 9th at the 2007 Canadian Championships. In the 2007-08 season, Brodeur/Mattatall won the 2007 Ondrej Nepela Memorial and placed 7th at the 2008 Canadian Championships. Their placement at the event earned them a trip to the 2008 Four Continents, where they placed 7th.

Brodeur/Mattatal qualified for the 2009 World Championships and placed tenth. They announced their competitive retirement on March 25, 2011. Mattatall now works as a Project Engineer at K+S Windsor Salt in Pugwash, Nova Scotia. John still coaches part time and is quite involved in the skating community.

Personal life 
Mattatall is studying engineering at Dalhousie University.
In 2018 John got engaged to his long time girlfriend LaFawnduh Stewart. Their wedding was held in LaFawnduh's home town of  Compton CA.

Competitive highlights

Pairs with Brodeur

Pairs with Findlay

Pairs with Trembley

Singles career

References

External links

 
 
 

1982 births
Living people
Canadian male single skaters
Canadian male pair skaters
Sportspeople from Nova Scotia
People from Cumberland County, Nova Scotia